David Connell may refer to:

 David Connell (cinematographer) (born 1955), Australian cinematographer
 David Connell (football), former manager of East Stirlingshire F.C.
 David Connell (television producer) (1931–1995), American television producer
 David Connell (musician), bass guitarist and member of The Connells, American band
 David H. Connell (musician), organist and choral conductor; director of the Yale Glee Club 1991–2001
 David Connell (actor) (1935–2013), American actor
 W. David Connell (born 1954), amateur astronomer after whom the asteroid 25957 Davidconnell is named

See also 
 David O'Connell (disambiguation)